Victoria Newhouse (née Victoria Carrington Benedict) is an American architectural historian. She founded the Architectural History Foundation, a nonprofit scholarly book publisher, and is a frequent author on architecture-related subjects. She has written for major architecture journals and newspapers.

Newhouse grew up in New York City and graduated from Bryn Mawr College in 1959, having majored in French. She moved to Paris and married French count Régis de Ramel there. The two later divorced, and Newhouse returned to New York. She began working in architecture as the architecture editor for George Braziller, Inc., and began the Architectural History Foundation in 1977, operating it until 1994. Newhouse wrote her first book in 1989, and has published four since then.

Early life
Victoria Newhouse was raised in Manhattan, New York City; her parents were John C. Benedict, a retired investment banker, and an English mother. She graduated from the Brearley School, an elite private school. She subsequently attended Bryn Mawr College, graduating in 1959. There she majored in French, and was a magna cum laude graduate. After graduation, she moved to Paris, where she met her first husband, French count Régis de Ramel.

Career
One of Newhouse's early jobs was as the architecture editor for George Braziller, beginning in the mid 1960s. Braziller had fired his prior editor and gave her the job. She had no knowledge of architecture, though she returned to school to learn. She earned a master's degree in architectural history at Columbia University.

Newhouse established the Architectural History Foundation, a nonprofit scholarly book publisher, in 1977. The foundation aimed to support books that would otherwise be unpublished, and to raise the quality of works about architecture. Newhouse closed the foundation in 1994, stating that its mission had been fulfilled.

Newhouse first wrote a book on Wallace K. Harrison, in 1989.

Victoria Newhouse's works have a variety of subjects over time periods and regions, though she analyzes architecture in each of her works by referencing buildings' structural, social, and political aspects.

Newhouse was a judge for the Pritzker Prize, "architecture's highest honor", for three years from 2006 to 2008. She writes and lectures about museums, writing articles for The New York Times, Architectural Record, Architectural Digest, and ARTnews.

Personal life
She married a French count, Régis de Ramel, obtaining the name Victoria Carrington Benedict de Ramel. The marriage ended in divorce, with no children. On April 13, 1973, she married Samuel Irving Newhouse Jr., a man ten years her elder. He died on October 1, 2017, at the age of 89. The couple had no children, though he had three from a prior marriage, and Victoria and Samuel acquired a pug named Nero. The dog died and was replaced by Cicero, in 1998.

Newhouse was raised Episcopal, though became a devout Catholic later in life, with a strong interest in religions.

She has been a long-term art collector and museum patron. She and her husband had an apartment at the UN Plaza, as well as homes in Bellport and Palm Beach. The homes are decorated with the family's large art collection.

Books
 Wallace K. Harrison, Architect (1989)
 Towards a New Museum (1998, expanded edition 2006)
 Art and the Power of Placement (2005)
 Site and Sound: The Architecture and Acoustics of New Opera Houses and Concert Halls (2012)
 Chaos and Culture: Renzo Piano Building Workshop and the Stavros Niarchos Foundation Cultural Center in Athens (2017)

See also

 List of American historians
 List of American print journalists
 List of people from New York City

References

External links
 

20th-century births
Year of birth missing (living people)
Living people
20th-century American non-fiction writers
21st-century American non-fiction writers
American architectural historians
American architecture writers
American founders
American magazine journalists
American women journalists
American women non-fiction writers
Journalists from New York City
Writers from New York City
20th-century American women writers
20th-century American journalists
Bryn Mawr College alumni
21st-century American women writers
Historians from New York (state)
American people of English descent